The Rounder Girls represented Austria in the Eurovision Song Contest 2000 with the song "All To You" where they reached 14th place. The Rounder Girls consisted of three women: Tini Kainrath, Kim Cooper and Lynne Kieran, who are from Vienna, New York, and London, respectively.

The trio continued to record and tour, and in 2009 announced a joint tour with the Austrian entrants to the Eurovision Song Contest 2005, Global Kryner.

On 8 December 2013  band member Lynne Kieran died at the age of 53.

References

Eurovision Song Contest entrants for Austria
Eurovision Song Contest entrants of 2000